Podosphaera clandestina var. clandestina is a plant pathogen that causes a powdery mildew in apricots and peaches.

References

Fungal tree pathogens and diseases
Stone fruit tree diseases
clandestina var. clandestina